The 1954 RAC Tourist Trophy was a motor race for Sports Cars which took place on 11 September 1954 on the roads around Dundrod, (County Antrim, Northern Ireland). It was the 21st RAC Tourist Trophy and the fifth race of the 1954 World Sportscar Championship. The Tourist Trophy was awarded to handicap winners Paul Armagnac and Gérard Laureau driving a D.B. HBR Panhard however the overall race win for championship points was attained by Mike Hawthorn and Maurice Trintignant driving a Ferrari 750 Monza.

Going into the race, Ferrari was leading the World Sportscar Championship by eight points from Lancia. Victory by the Italian marque gave it the title for the second season running.

Report

Entry

A grand total of 56 racing cars were registered for this event, of which  52 arrived for practice and qualifying. Unlike 1953, many of the top European teams travelled to Northern Ireland from mainland Europe. 
Scuderia Ferrari, who could win the World Championship on the streets of County Antrim, entered two Ferrari 750 Monzas for the Le Mans winners José Froilán González and Maurice Trintignant, back-up by Mike Hawthorn and Umberto Maglioli. Hoping the keep the championship alive, Scuderia Lancia sent two of their D24s and two D25s (re-bodied D24s) over. Amongst their line-up was Juan Manuel Fangio and Alberto Ascari.  From England, the two work teams of Jaguar Cars Ltd. and Aston Martin. The team from Coventry arrived with three cars, Jaguar D-Types for the all British pairings of Tony Rolt/Duncan Hamilton; Stirling Moss/Peter Walker and Peter Whitehead/Ken Wharton. David Brown also brought along three of his team’s DB3S, with Reg Parnell pairing up alongside Roy Salvadori. Graham Whitehead/Dennis Poore and winners of last year’s RAC Tourist Trophy, Peter Collins/Pat Griffith made up the crew of the other two Astons. Also from England came works entries from  Automobiles Frazer Nash, Lotus Engineering, HWM  and Kieft Cars. There were joined manufactures teams from Maserati, Osca and Deutsch et Bonnet.

Race

Following an accident in practice, the Ferrari 750 Monza of González, did not start and Trintignant was transferred into the remaining car of Hawthorn. This resulted in Maglioli also missing out.

Although World Championship points were awarded based on scratch positions, the race itself was run as a handicap race, so the distance each car needed to complete depended on engine capacity. The race was scheduled for 94 laps, however no car started from scratch, the largest engined vehicles being the Lancias with a handicap of 4 laps and 5 minutes, 11.7 seconds. The race would end after the first car completed 94 handicap laps.

The race was held in drying conditions, but rain returned during the race. Despite this, the Italian teams would finish in the first three places. Car number 15 (Scuderia Ferrari), driven by Mike Hawthorn and Maurice Trintignant took an impressive victory, winning in a time of 7hrs 14:13 mins., averaging a speed of 90.703 mph. Second place went to the  Lancia of Piero Taruffi and Juan Manuel Fangio their D24, just 2:16 minutes behind. The podium was completed by another Lancia, that of Robert Manzon and Eugenio Castellotti, two laps adrift. Meanwhile, the HWM Jaguar 108 of George Abecassis and Jim Mayers were the best of the English entrants, finishing in fourth place, with the best of the works-Jaguars further behind in sixth.

This year’s Tourist Trophy could come up with a sport historical particularity. Similar to the 24 Hours of Le Mans, the handicap index rating was extended in the TT. In this rating, power and engine capacity of the vehicle in relation to the weight were set. This led to a handicap for large-displacement vehicles. This index score was extended parallel to the overall rating. Although the overall standings was used for the World Sportscar Championship, the index score was used to the decide the outcome of the Tourist Trophy. Thus this was won by the small D.B. HBR Panhard by Paul Armagnac and Gérard Laureau , who finished only 21st place in the overall standings. 
	
Having won the scratch race, Ferrari gained the necessary points advance over Lancia to take the World Championship for Manufacturers title for the second season in a row, with one round remaining in Mexico. Should Ferrari win the 1954 Carrera Panamericana, they would have the maximum score available due to have the points are awarded, as only the best 4 results out of the 7 races could be retained by each manufacturer.

Official Classification

Scratch Race (for Championship points)
Class Winners are in Bold text.

 Fastest Lap: Mike Hawthorn, 4:49.000secs (92.916 mph)

Scratch Race - Class Winners

Overall Positions (Handicap event / adjusted result)

Top Six :

Standings after the race

Note: Only the top five positions are included in this set of standings.
Championship points were awarded for the first six places in each race in the order of 8-6-4-3-2-1. Manufacturers were only awarded points for their highest finishing car with no points awarded for positions filled by additional cars. Only the best four results out of the six races could be retained by each manufacturer.

References

RAC
RAC Tourist Trophy
RAC Tourist Trophy